The 2011–12 ISU Short Track Speed Skating World Cup was a multi-race tournament over a season for short track speed skating. The season began on 22 October 2011 and ended on 12 February 2012. The World Cup was organised by the International Skating Union (ISU) who also ran world cups and championships in speed skating and figure skating.

Calendar

Men

Salt Lake City

Saguenay

Nagoya

Shanghai

Moscow

Dordrecht

Women

Salt Lake City

Saguenay

Nagoya

Shanghai

Moscow

Dordrecht

World Cup standings
* Note – Standings are calculated on the best 6 out of 8 results for the individual distances

See also
2012 World Short Track Speed Skating Championships

Notes

References

External links 
 ISU.org World Cup Schedule

ISU Short Track Speed Skating World Cup
Isu Short Track Speed Skating World Cup, 2011-12
Isu Short Track Speed Skating World Cup, 2011-12